The Bischof (2,033 metres) is a mountain peak in the Bavarian Prealps of southern Germany.

It lies in the westernmost part of the Bavarian Prealps in the Ester Mountains near Garmisch-Partenkirchen.

The usual climb to the top runs from Oberau via the Oberauer Steig to the saddle between the Bischof and the Hoher Fricken and on over the western ridge on good tracks through the Latschen to the summit (a total of about 3.5 hours climb).

External links 
 tour description

References 

Mountains of the Alps
Two-thousanders of Germany
Garmisch-Partenkirchen
Bavarian Prealps